Francis Lloyd  was a Welsh Anglican priest .

The son of Bishop Humphrey Lloyd, he was educated at Oriel College, Oxford. He held livings at Criccieth, Llanrhaiadr in Kinmerch, Llandyrnog and Llandudno. He was appointed Archdeacon of Merioneth, in 1683, a post he held under his death in 1712.

References

Alumni of Oriel College, Oxford
Archdeacons of Merioneth
17th-century Welsh Anglican priests
18th-century Welsh Anglican priests
1712 deaths